Compton Park House (or Compton House) is a Grade I listed manor house in Compton Chamberlayne, Wiltshire, England.

History 
Compton Park House was the seat of the Penruddocke (or Penruddock) family from the mid-16th century until 1930. They were a notable Royalist family, with Colonel John Penruddock, an owner of the house, being the namesake for the failed 1655 Penruddock uprising against Oliver Cromwell. For this he was tried and executed at Exeter on 16 May 1655. Many other members of the family were local Members of Parliament or High sheriffs of Wiltshire.

Architecture 
The present house may occupy the site of a medieval manor house; Pevsner saw fragments of medieval work. It was refitted internally by Sir Edward Penruddocke in the late 17th century and rebuilt externally in 1780 by Charles Penruddocke. The drawing room from about 1700 has panelling and rich decoration in Grinling Gibbons style, with a plaster ceiling from the same period. In the dining room, part of the 1780 additions, is a plaster ceiling in Adam style.

The stable block dates from the late 18th century. The house has been a Grade I listed building since 1960.

Compton Park 

The house is set in parkland, once a medieval deer park, overlooking a lake formed by damming a stream running north into the River Nadder. It was landscaped in the 18th century by Capability Brown.

Notable Occupants 
Sir George Penruddock (died 1581), High Sheriff of Wiltshire; MP for Salisbury, Wiltshire and Downton
John Penruddock (died 1601), MP for Wilton and Southampton
Edward Penruddock, High Sheriff in 1597
Sir John Penruddocke (died 1648), High Sheriff in 1643
Colonel John Penruddock (1619–1655), a royalist who took part in the failed 1655 Penruddock uprising against Oliver Cromwell, was tried and executed at Exeter on 16 May 1655.
Thomas Penruddocke (born c. 1648, died before 1695), MP for Wilton
Charles Penruddocke (died 1788), High Sheriff in 1751
Charles Penruddocke (1743–1788), High Sheriff, MP for Wiltshire
John Penruddocke (1770–1841), High Sheriff, MP for Wilton
Charles Penruddocke (died 1899), High Sheriff in 1861

References 

Country houses in Wiltshire
Grade I listed buildings in Wiltshire
Grade I listed houses